The 1988 Virginia Slims of California was a women's tennis tournament played on indoor carpet courts at the Oakland-Alameda County Coliseum Arena in Oakland, California in the United States and was part of the Category 4 tier of the 1988 WTA Tour. It was the 17th edition of the tournament and was held from February 15 through February 21, 1988. First-seeded Martina Navratilova won the singles title.

Finals

Singles

 Martina Navratilova defeated  Larisa Savchenko 6–1, 6–2
 It was Navratilova's 2nd singles title of the year and the 131st of her career.

Doubles

 Rosemary Casals /  Martina Navratilova defeated  Hana Mandlíková /  Jana Novotná 6–4, 6–4
 It was Casals' only title of the year and the 42nd of her career. It was Navratilova's 4th title of the year and the 268th of her career.

References

External links
 Official website
 ITF tournament edition details

Virginia Slims of California
Silicon Valley Classic
Virginia Slims of California
Virginia Slims of California
Virginia Slims of California